Harpa major, common name 	large harp, or major harp, is a species of large predatory sea snail, a marine gastropod mollusks in the family Harpidae, the harp snails and their allies.

Description
The size of the shell varies between 60 mm and 130 mm . The average adult reaches 3 1/2 inches and the shells have an ovate body with a heavily calloused spire. The columella, or the lower portion of the inside coil, has dark brown coloring.
 It has a long siphon, a large mouth and a very large foot in proportion to its shell, which it uses to hunt its prey. A voracious nocturnal predator of benthic crustaceans on sandy bottoms, it can prey on crabs as large as itself.

Distribution
This marine species occurs off East Africa, Tanzania, Mozambique, the Mascarene Basin; off Hawaii

References

 Walls, J.G. (1980). Conchs, tibias and harps. A survey of the molluscan families Strombidae and Harpidae. T.F.H. Publications Ltd, Hong Kong.

External links 
 Gastropods.com info, shell images

Harpidae
Gastropods described in 1798